Madhukar Rao Bhagwat was one of the earliest Swayamsevak of the Rashtriya Swayamsevak Sangh. He first started as an ordinary Pracharak of Gujarat and later became President of the Chandrapur zone and Gujarat’s regional promoter of RSS. He was close to past sarsanghchalaks including Keshav Baliram Hedgewar and M. S. Golwalkar, and is the father of present RSS Sarsanghchalaks Mohan Bhagwat.

Influence
He was the primary influence in the early life of politicians including Deputy Prime Minister of India L. K. Advani.

References

Rashtriya Swayamsevak Sangh pracharaks
Activists from Gujarat